The 2000 Georgetown Hoyas football team was an American football team that represented Georgetown University as an independent during the 2000 NCAA Division I-AA football season. 

In their eighth year under head coach Bob Benson, the Hoyas compiled a 5–6 record. Brett Crowder, Gharun Hester, Ryan O'Donoghue and Reid Wakefield were the team captains.

This was Georgetown's first year since 1950 competing as an independent program at the Division I level. Since moving up from Division III in 1993, Georgetown had played in the Metro Atlantic Athletic Conference, but in January 2000, the university president announced that the Hoyas would switch their affiliation to the Patriot League in 2001. Georgetown's independent schedule in 2000 included a mix of former MAAC foes (Duquesne, Fairfield, Iona, Marist, St. Peter's) and future Patriot rivals (Bucknell, Fordham, Holy Cross).

Georgetown played its home games at Kehoe Field on the university campus in Washington, D.C.

Schedule

References

Georgetown
Georgetown Hoyas football seasons
Georgetown Hoyas football